Joan Martínez may refer to:
 Joan Martinez Alier, Catalan economist
 Joan Martínez Vilaseca, Spanish footballer and manager
 Joan Lino Martínez, Spanish athlete